Ali Tatar Tawfiq Nerway known as Ali Tatar (born 15 October 1968, Amedi) is an Iraqi Kurdish politician of the Kurdistan Democratic Party (K.D.P). Tatar is the current governor of Duhok.

Early life and education 

He was born into a family of a political background and together with his family left into exile to Iran as a child in the 1970s. He joined the Kurdish liberation forces in 1989 and for some time was imprisoned by the Iraqi forces. Tatar has a bachelor's degree in college of Arts – History department from University of Duhok and finished master's degree in majoring new and contemporary history and in 2008 he received a PhD.

In 2012 he became an assistant professor at the University of Duhok and in 2018 he was awarded a full professorship. He is also a member of the Board of Trustees from the American University of Kurdistan.

Professional career 
He was the Director General of the Intelligence Unit of the Duhok Governorate between the 2002 and 2011 and held several positions within the KDP before assuming as the Governor of Duhok on appointment by Prime Minister Masrour Barzani in 2020.

References

Governors of Dahuk Governorate
1968 births
Iraqi Kurdish people
Kurdistan Democratic Party politicians
People from Amadiya
Living people